Ljubinković is a Serbian surname. Notable people with the surname include:

Marko Ljubinković (born 1981), former Serbian footballer
Zoran Ljubinković (born 1982), Serbian footballer

Serbian surnames
Slavic-language surnames
Patronymic surnames